

Biography 
Vyatcheslav Kagan-Paley, also known as Slava ("Слава" Каган-Палей), is a Russian born, Israeli countertenor and baritone. As a child, he studied violin and piano. In 1976, he won the first television and radio competition for young performers in Minsk as a singer. Kagan-Paley continued his violin studies at the Belarusian State Conservatory and in 1987, he began singing at the Belarusian Academic Capella. That same year he made his debut as a soprano soloist in Schumann's Requiem with the Leningrad Philharmonic. Two years later, Dr. Irina Antonova, the director of the Pushkin Museum of Fine Arts in Moscow, invited Kagan-Paley to give a recital there, and this resulted in several engagements including The Vienna State Opera, various recordings and television appearances. Kagan-Paley's fifth solo recital was recorded live by Melodia at the Astrakhan International Vocal Festival (named in honor of the great Russian singers Barsova and Maksakova) which included music by Caccini, Bach, Handel and songs by Brahms, R. Strauss, and Mahler's “Kindertotenlieder”. The talents of the young singer were appreciated by Leonard Bernstein who, after meeting him in St. Petersburg in the summer of 1989, planned to arrange joint performances; Bernstein's death ended these plans.

Kagan-Paley was awarded a grant by the Oppenheimer Charitable Trust, and from 1989 to 1992 he completed the post-diploma vocal training course under Professor David Pollard at the Guildhall School of Music and Drama in London. In 1993 the Opera Course was completed. In the same year Kagan-Paley attended masterclasses with Graham Johnson and Geoffrey Parsons. His 1992 opera debut as Oberon in Benjamin Britten's “A Midsummer Night's Dream” at the Guildhall was greeted with great public and critical acclaim.

Kagan-Paley's international career started in 1993 when he performed the role of Joan of Arc in the world premiere of “Arms for the Maid” for the Royal Opera House Garden Venture. Since then, he has traveled extensively giving recitals in Russia, the United States, Europe and the United Kingdom. In Germany, the Czech Republic and Hungary, he sang the role of The Witch in the opera Rapunzel by Lou Harrison, with the Prague Mozart Foundation. He also made guest appearances at the Normandy Music Festival, performing Franz Schubert’s Winterreise, Sviatoslav Richter’s "December Night’s” Festival with Yuri Bashmet, and at the New Seasons’ Festival in St. Petersburg. After Kagan-Paley's recital in Tallinn, Estonian TV made a documentary about his life and art.

The collaboration with the distinguished Russian pianist, Boris Berezovsky, resulted in a series of concerts and recordings in Russia, Japan and Great Britain. After their recital at Leighton House, London, The Times described Kagan-Paley's voice as "a diamond among voices”. Alexander Waugh wrote in London's Evening Standard “an extraordinary, stunning alto […] a sound like nothing else on this earth, a beautiful siren, strong and vital without ever piercing the air. I never heard a human voice quite like it[…]"

In the same year Kagan-Paley made a second recording, Antonio Vivaldi’s "Nisi Dominus" and Giovanni Pergolesi’s "Stabat Mater" with the Vivaldi Orchestra, conducted by Svetlana Bezrodnaya and Bashmet (viola solo) on the Olympia label.

Between 1995 and 1997 Kagan-Paley signed an exclusive recording contract with Victor Entertainment (JVC Japan) and embarked upon his first Japanese concert tour to promote his new album Ave Maria, which sold 250,000 copies in 3 months, and became Number One selling classical CD in Japan. His second CD, Vocalise, won the Japan Grand Prix as “Album of the Year” in 1997.

At the end of 1997 Kagan-Paley and Berezovsky made their “extraordinary debut” in the Suntory Hall in Tokyo.

In 1999 Kagan-Paley was invited by Opéra National de Lyon to sing the role of Masha in the World Premiere of Péter Eötvös’ "Three Sisters" conducted by Kent Nagano, recorded live by Deutsche Grammophon. He sang the title role of Tolomeo in George Handel’s "Tolomeo, King of Egypt" at Broomhill Opera (UK).

Since 2000 Kagan-Paley has worked extensively in Russia, Europe and Japan. Amongst other engagements, he has performed in Christoph Gluck’s "Orpheus and Eurydice" with the Raanana Symphony Orchestra. To date, Kagan-Paley has completed 10 Japanese tours, and in 2003 he sang the main role of a Japanese Princess in the World Premiere Avi Ben Shabtai's opera Damascus Drum in Israel. Kagan-Paley Kagan-Paley's voice can be heard in many documentaries and commercials, while his interpretation of the Caccini's Ave Maria was used as the soundtrack for the movie One More Kiss. Kagan-Paley has performed in many events including the Emma Chaplin Show in Caesarea as well as many charities, including cancer research (GB), victims of terrorist attacks in Israel and the Paralympics in Tokyo.

In 2005 Kagan-Paley celebrated the 10th anniversary of his work in Japan with a tour and appeared in a NHK televised Christmas special with the Tokyo Philharmonic Orchestra.

Until 2010 Kagan-Paley worked extensively, giving recitals in Europe, Japan and the Middle East. Made a new recording for Sony Epic (Japan), a debut at Blue Note (Nagoya) with a new, predominantly jazz repertoire. Was an invited guest at National Opera in Beijing (China). He worked on a new recording project with Greg Walsh (UK).

During 2011 Kagan-Paley started with a new programme recital at Pushkin Museum of Fine Arts (Michelangelo Hall) in Moscow. Kagan-Paley has recorded 18 CD's and a DVD on “Olimpia”, JVC (Japan), Deutsche Grammophone, BMG, Sony Epic, Universal (Japan) labels.

In 2012 Kagan-Paley went on a concert tour with Armen Guzelimian on the piano in the United States. He performed a concert in Israel. He recorded for The Voice for Warner Music Japan, released in January 2013, followed by a concert tour in Tokyo, Osaka and Nagoya.

Discography 
Vivaldi/Nisi Dominus/Pergolesi — Stabat Mater, Olympia, 1994

Ave Maria — Victor JVC, Japan, 1995

Due Impressione — Victor JVC, Japan, 1995

Vocalise — Victor JVC, Japan, 1996

Ottimo — Victor JVC, Japan, 1996

Lullaby — Victor JVC, Japan, 1997

Nightingale and Rose — Russian romances with Berezovsky (piano), Victor JVC, Japan, 1997

Kagan-Paley — DVD, Victor JVC, Japan

Three Sisters — opera by Eötvös, live recording at Opéra de Lyon, Deutsche Grammophon, 1999

Laudate — Polydor K.K., 1999

One wish — Polydor K.K., 2000

Nile — Main Theme by Kitaro, BMG, 2000

The Concert — Live recording at Tokyo Opera City Hall, Universal, Japan, 2001

Kagan-Paley — Universal, Japan, 2001

Trinity — Universal, Japan, 2001

Kagan-Paley's Best — Victor JVC, Japan, 2002

Beautiful — Victor JVC, Japan, 2003

The Voice — Warner Music, Japan, 2013

References

Year of birth missing (living people)
Living people
Belarusian musicians
Operatic countertenors
Russian performers of early music
People from Gomel